Louisville Girls High School (LGHS) is a private girls' secondary school in Ijebu-Itele, Ogun State, Nigeria. The school was established in 1998, and is run by the Sisters of St. Louis, Nigeria.

Student achievements
In 2012 the West African Examination Council (WAEC) announced Iyeyinka Omigbodun of Louisville High as the student with second-best WASSCE results nationally. In 2018 the WAEC announced Louisville High student Adenike Temitope Adedara as having the country's third best examination results. Another student, Ofomata Chinyere, won the national Rising Star short story writing competition in 2018. In 2019 the WAEC announced Louisville Girls as one of the three schools from the Federal Capital Territory with best overall results in the WASSCE. In October 2019 a Year Two student, Adzira Galadima, won the Rising Star national poetry competition with a poem about forced marriage, and in December 2019 another student at the school, Jolaosho Oluwatoroti Otokini, won the UBA Foundation National Essay Competition. In 2020 a Louisville Girls High School student, Agnes Maduafokwa, gained the highest national score in the Unified Tertiary Matriculation Examination.

References

External links
 School website

Girls' schools in Nigeria
Secondary schools in Nigeria
Private schools in Nigeria
Educational institutions established in 1998
1998 establishments in Nigeria
Catholic schools in Nigeria